Cheryomushki is a rural locality (a settlement) and the administrative center of Lebyazhensky Selsoviet Rural Settlement, Kursky District, Kursk Oblast, Russia. Population:

Geography 
The settlement is located 86 km from the Russia–Ukraine border, 10 km south-east of Kursk.

 Streets
There are the following streets in the locality: Beregovaya, Polevaya and Stepnaya (187 houses).

 Climate
Cheryomushki has a warm-summer humid continental climate (Dfb in the Köppen climate classification).

Transport 

The rural locality is situated 17 km from Kursk Vostochny Airport, 107 km from Belgorod International Airport and 207 km from Voronezh Peter the Great Airport.

References

Notes

Sources

Rural localities in Kursky District, Kursk Oblast